Wilfred Ibbotson (1 October 1926 – 2014) was an English professional footballer who played in the Football League for Mansfield Town and Sheffield Wednesday.

References

1926 births
2014 deaths
English footballers
Association football inside forwards
English Football League players
Sheffield Wednesday F.C. players
Mansfield Town F.C. players
Goole Town F.C. players